Love Is a Funny Thing (a.k.a. A Man I Like) is a 1969 French romantic drama film directed by Claude Lelouch.

Plot
An accidental meeting in the United States between an actress and a composer, both French. Leaving her husband and child in Paris, Françoise, cinema actress, driven to the United States, is waiting for her break. Composer Henri, married to an Italian, is only in New York to record film music. They are both waiting to go to Los Angeles. There, they become lovers. The next day, Henri decides to delay his return for 24 hours to take Françoise to Las Vegas. Another night of love later, they hire a car and travel across the US with the intention of heading back for New York.

Cast
 Jean-Paul Belmondo as Henri
 Annie Girardot as Françoise
 Kaz Garas as Paul
 Peter Bergman as Director
 Farrah Fawcett as Patricia
 Foster Hood as Indian
 Bill Quinn as Passenger
 Timothy Blake as The Dominos
 Jerry Cipperly as Waiter in Cafe
 Marie Pia Conte as Henri's Wife
 Arturo Dominici as Customs Officer
 Sweet Emma as Herself
 Marcel Bozzuffi as Françoise's Husband

Production
Parts of the film were shot at Monument Valley and the Goulding Trading Post in Utah.

References

External links

Love is a Funny Thing at Le Film Guide

1960s French films
1969 films
Adultery in films
Films directed by Claude Lelouch
Films scored by Francis Lai
Films set in the United States
Films shot in Utah
French romantic drama films